The Turk, also known as the Mechanical Turk or Automaton Chess Player, was a fraudulent chess-playing machine constructed in the late 18th century. From 1770 until its destruction by fire in 1854 it was exhibited by various owners as an automaton, though it was eventually revealed to be an elaborate hoax. Constructed and unveiled in 1770 by Wolfgang von Kempelen (1734–1804) to impress Empress Maria Theresa of Austria, the mechanism appeared to be able to play a strong game of chess against a human opponent, as well as perform the knight's tour, a puzzle that requires the player to move a knight to occupy every square of a chessboard exactly once.

The Turk was in fact a mechanical illusion that allowed a human chess master hiding inside to operate the machine. With a skilled operator, the Turk won most of the games played during its demonstrations around Europe and the Americas for nearly 84 years, playing and defeating many challengers including statesmen such as Napoleon Bonaparte and Benjamin Franklin. The device was later purchased in 1804 and exhibited by Johann Nepomuk Mälzel. The chess masters who secretly operated it included Johann Allgaier, Boncourt, Aaron Alexandre, William Lewis, Jacques Mouret, and William Schlumberger, but the operators within the mechanism during Kempelen's original tour remain a mystery.

Construction

Kempelen was inspired to build the Turk following his attendance at the court of Maria Theresa of Austria at Schönbrunn Palace, where François Pelletier was performing an illusion act. An exchange afterward resulted in Kempelen promising to return to the Palace with an invention that would top the illusions.

The result of the challenge was the Automaton Chess-player, known in modern times as the Turk. The machine consisted of a life-sized model of a human head and torso, with a black beard and grey eyes, and dressed in Ottoman robes and a turban—"the traditional costume", according to journalist and author Tom Standage, "of an oriental sorcerer". Placed on the top of the cabinet was a chessboard, which measured  on each side. The front of the cabinet consisted of three doors, an opening, and a drawer, which could be opened to reveal a red and white ivory chess set.

The interior of the machine was very complicated and designed to mislead those who observed it. When opened on the left, the front doors of the cabinet exposed a number of gears and cogs similar to clockwork. The section was designed so that if the back doors of the cabinet were open at the same time one could see through the machine. The other side of the cabinet did not house machinery; instead it contained a red cushion and some removable parts, as well as brass structures. This area was also designed to provide a clear line of vision through the machine. Underneath the robes of the Ottoman model, two other doors were hidden. These also exposed clockwork machinery and provided a similarly unobstructed view through the machine. The design allowed the presenter of the machine to open every available door to the public, to maintain the illusion.

Neither the clockwork visible to the left side of the machine nor the drawer that housed the chess set extended fully to the rear of the cabinet; they instead went only one third of the way. A sliding seat was also installed, allowing the operator inside to slide from place to place and thus evade observation as the presenter opened various doors. The sliding of the seat caused dummy machinery to slide into its place to further conceal the person inside the cabinet.

The chessboard on the top of the cabinet was thin enough to allow for a magnetic linkage. Each piece in the chess set had a small, strong magnet attached to its base, and when they were placed on the board the pieces would attract a magnet attached to a string under their specific places on the board. This allowed the operator inside the machine to see which pieces moved where on the chess board. The bottom of the chessboard had corresponding numbers, 1–64, allowing the operator to see which places on the board were affected by a player's move. The internal magnets were positioned in a way that outside magnetic forces did not influence them, and Kempelen would often allow a large magnet to sit at the side of the board in an attempt to show that the machine was not influenced by magnetism.

As a further means of misdirection, the Turk came with a small wooden coffin-like box that the presenter would place on the top of the cabinet. While Johann Nepomuk Mälzel, a later owner of the machine, did not use the box, Kempelen often peered into the box during play, suggesting that the box controlled some aspect of the machine. The box was believed by some to have supernatural power; Karl Gottlieb von Windisch wrote in his 1784 book Inanimate Reason that "[o]ne old lady, in particular, who had not forgotten the tales she had been told in her youth ... went and hid herself in a window seat, as distant as she could from the evil spirit, which she firmly believed possessed the machine."

The interior also contained a pegboard chess board connected to a pantograph-style series of levers that controlled the model's left arm. The metal pointer on the pantograph moved over the interior chessboard, and would simultaneously move the arm of the Turk over the chessboard on the cabinet. The range of motion allowed the operator to move the Turk's arm up and down, and turning the lever would open and close the Turk's hand, allowing it to grasp the pieces on the board. All of this was made visible to the operator by using a simple candle, which had a ventilation system through the model. Other parts of the machinery allowed for a clockwork-type sound to be played when the Turk made a move, further adding to the machinery illusion, and for the Turk to make various facial expressions. A voice box was added following the Turk's acquisition by Mälzel, allowing the machine to say  (French for "check") during matches.

An operator inside the machine also had tools to assist in communicating with the presenter outside. Two brass discs equipped with numbers were positioned opposite each other on the inside and outside of the cabinet. A rod could rotate the discs to the desired number, which acted as a code between the two.

Exhibition
The Turk made its debut in 1770 at Schönbrunn Palace, about six months after Pelletier's act. Kempelen addressed the court, presenting what he had built, and began the demonstration of the machine and its parts. With every showing of the Turk, Kempelen began by opening the doors and drawers of the cabinet, allowing members of the audience to inspect the machine. Following this display, Kempelen would announce that the machine was ready for a challenger.

Kempelen would inform the player that the Turk would use the white pieces and have the first move. Between moves the Turk kept its left arm on the cushion. The Turk could nod twice if it threatened its opponent's queen, and three times upon placing the king in check. If an opponent made an illegal move, the Turk would shake its head, move the piece back and make its own move, thus forcing a forfeit of its opponent's move. Louis Dutens, a traveller who observed a showing of the Turk, attempted to trick the machine "by giving the Queen the move of a Knight, but my mechanic opponent was not to be so imposed upon; he took up my Queen and replaced her in the square from which I had moved her". Kempelen made it a point to traverse the room during the match, and invited observers to bring magnets, irons, and lodestones to the cabinet to test whether the machine was run by a form of magnetism or weights. The first person to play against the Turk was Count Ludwig von Cobenzl, an Austrian courtier at the palace. Along with other challengers that day, he was quickly defeated, with observers of the match stating that the machine played aggressively, and typically beat its opponents within thirty minutes.

Another part of the machine's exhibition was the completion of the knight's tour, a famed chess puzzle. The puzzle requires the player to move a knight around a chessboard, touching each square once along the way. While most experienced chess players of the time still struggled with the puzzle, the Turk was capable of completing the tour without any difficulty from any starting point via a pegboard used by the operator with a mapping of the puzzle laid out.

The Turk also had the ability to converse with spectators using a letter board. The operator, whose identity during the period when Kempelen presented the machine at Schönbrunn Palace is unknown, was able to do this in English, French, and German. Topics of questions put to and answered by the Turk included its age, marital status, and its secret workings.

Tour of Europe
Following word of its debut, interest in the machine grew across Europe. Kempelen, however, was more interested in his other projects and avoided exhibiting the Turk, often lying about the machine's repair status to prospective challengers. Von Windisch wrote at one point that Kempelen "refused the entreaties of his friends, and a crowd of curious persons from all countries, the satisfaction of seeing this far-famed machine". In the decade following its debut at Schönbrunn Palace the Turk only played one opponent, Sir Robert Murray Keith, a Scottish noble, and Kempelen went as far as dismantling the Turk entirely following the match. Kempelen was quoted as referring to the invention as a "mere bagatelle", as he was not pleased with its popularity and would rather continue work on steam engines and machines that replicated human speech.

In 1781, Kempelen was ordered by Emperor Joseph II to reconstruct the Turk and deliver it to Vienna for a state visit from Grand Duke Paul of Russia and his wife. The appearance was so successful that Grand Duke Paul suggested a tour of Europe for the Turk, a request to which Kempelen reluctantly agreed.

The Turk began its European tour in 1783, beginning with an appearance in France in April. A stop at Versailles beginning on April 17, preceded an exhibition in Paris, where the Turk lost a match to Charles Godefroy de La Tour d'Auvergne, the Duc de Bouillon. Upon arrival in Paris in May 1783, it was displayed to the public and played a variety of opponents, including a lawyer named Mr. Bernard who was a second rank in chess ability. Following the sessions at Versailles, demands increased for a match with François-André Danican Philidor, who was considered the best chess player of his time. Moving to the Café de la Régence, the machine played many of the most skilled players, often losing (e.g. against Bernard and Verdoni), until securing a match with Philidor at the Académie des Sciences. While Philidor won his match with the Turk, Philidor's son noted that his father called it "his most fatiguing game of chess ever!" The Turk's final game in Paris was against Benjamin Franklin, who was serving as ambassador to France from the United States. Franklin reportedly enjoyed the game with the Turk and was interested in the machine for the rest of his life, keeping a copy of Philip Thicknesse's book The Speaking Figure and the Automaton Chess Player, Exposed and Detected in his personal library.

Following his tour of Paris, Kempelen moved the Turk to London, where it was exhibited daily for five shillings. Thicknesse, known in his time as a skeptic, sought out the Turk in an attempt to expose the inner workings of the machine. While he respected Kempelen as "a very ingenious man", he asserted that the Turk was an elaborate hoax with a small child inside the machine, describing the machine as "a complicated piece of clockwork ... which is nothing more, than one, of many other ingenious devices, to misguide and delude the observers".

After a year in London, Kempelen and the Turk travelled to Leipzig, stopping in various European cities along the way. It then moved to Amsterdam, after which Kempelen is said to have accepted an invitation to the Sanssouci palace in Potsdam of Frederick the Great, King of Prussia. The story goes that Frederick enjoyed the Turk so much that he paid a large sum of money to Kempelen in exchange for the Turk's secrets. Frederick never gave the secret away, but was reportedly disappointed to learn how the machine worked. This story is almost certainly apocryphal; there is no evidence of the Turk's encounter with Frederick, the first mention of which comes in the early 19th century, by which time the Turk was also incorrectly said to have played against George III of Great Britain. It seems most likely that the machine stayed dormant at Schönbrunn Palace for over two decades, although Kempelen attempted unsuccessfully to sell it in his final years. Kempelen died at the age of 70 on 26 March 1804.

Mälzel and the machine
Following the death of Kempelen, the Turk remained unexhibited until 1805 when Kempelen's son decided to sell it to Johann Nepomuk Mälzel, a Bavarian musician with an interest in various machines and devices. Mälzel, whose successes included patenting a form of metronome, had tried to purchase the Turk once previously, before Kempelen's death. The original attempt had failed, owing to Kempelen's asking price of 20,000 francs; Kempelen's son sold the machine to Mälzel for half this sum.

Upon acquiring the Turk, Mälzel had to learn its secrets and make some repairs to get it back in working order. His stated goal was to make explaining the Turk a greater challenge. While the completion of this goal took ten years, the Turk still made appearances, most notably with Napoleon Bonaparte.

In 1809, Napoleon I of France arrived at Schönbrunn Palace to play the Turk. According to an eyewitness report, Mälzel took responsibility for the construction of the machine while preparing the game, and the Turk (Johann Baptist Allgaier) saluted Napoleon before the start of the match. The details of the match have been published over the years in numerous accounts, many of them contradictory. According to Bradley Ewart, it is believed that the Turk sat at its cabinet, and Napoleon sat at a separate chess table. Napoleon's table was in a roped-off area and he was not allowed to cross into the Turk's area, with Mälzel crossing back and forth to make each player's move and allowing a clear view for the spectators. In a surprise move, Napoleon took the first turn instead of allowing the Turk to make the first move, as was usual; but Mälzel allowed the game to continue. Shortly thereafter, Napoleon attempted an illegal move. Upon noticing the move, the Turk returned the piece to its original spot and continued the game. Napoleon attempted the illegal move a second time, and the Turk responded by removing the piece from the board entirely and taking its turn. Napoleon then attempted the move a third time, the Turk responding with a sweep of its arm, knocking all the pieces off the board. Napoleon was reportedly amused, and then played a real game with the machine, completing nineteen moves before tipping over his king in surrender. Alternate versions of the story include Napoleon being unhappy about losing to the machine, playing the machine at a later time, playing one match with a magnet on the board, and playing a match with a shawl around the head and body of the Turk in an attempt to obscure its vision.

In 1811, Mälzel brought the Turk to Milan for a performance with Eugène de Beauharnais, the Prince of Venice and Viceroy of Italy. Beauharnais enjoyed the machine so much that he offered to purchase it from Mälzel. After some serious bargaining, Beauharnais acquired the Turk for 30,000 francs—three times what Mälzel had paid—and kept it for four years. In 1815, Mälzel returned to Beauharnais in Munich and asked to buy the Turk back. There exist two versions of how much he had to pay, eventually working out an agreement. One version appeared in the French periodical . The complete story does not make a lot of sense since Mälzel visited Paris again, and he also could import his "Conflagration of Moscow".

Following the repurchase, Mälzel brought the Turk back to Paris, where he made acquaintances of many of the leading chess players at Café de la Régence. Mälzel stayed in France with the machine until 1818, when he moved to London and held a number of performances with the Turk and many of his other machines. In London, Mälzel and his act received a large amount of press, and he continued improving the machine, ultimately installing a voice box so the machine could say  when placing a player in check.

In 1819, Mälzel took the Turk on a tour of the United Kingdom. There were several new developments in the act, such as allowing the opponent the first move and eliminating the king's bishop's pawn from the Turk's pieces. This pawn handicap created further interest in the Turk, and spawned a book by W. J. Hunneman chronicling the matches played with this handicap. Despite the handicap, the Turk (operated by Mouret at the time) ended up with forty-five victories, three losses, and two stalemates.

Mälzel in North America
The appearances of the Turk were profitable for Mälzel, and he continued by taking it and his other machines to the United States. In 1826, he opened an exhibition in New York City that slowly grew in popularity, giving rise to many newspaper stories and anonymous threats of exposure of the secret. Mälzel's problem was finding a proper operator for the machine, having trained an unknown woman in France before coming to the United States. He ended up recalling a former operator, William Schlumberger, from Alsace in Europe to come to America and work for him again once Mälzel was able to provide the money for Schlumberger's transport.

Upon Schlumberger's arrival, the Turk debuted in Boston, Mälzel spinning a story that the New York chess players could not handle full games and that the Boston players were much better opponents. This was a success for many weeks, and the tour moved to Philadelphia for three months. Following Philadelphia, the Turk moved to Baltimore, where it played for a number of months, including losing a match against Charles Carroll, a signer of the Declaration of Independence. The exhibition in Baltimore brought news that two brothers had constructed their own machine, the Walker Chess-player. Mälzel viewed the competing machine and attempted to buy it, but the offer was declined and the duplicate machine toured for a number of years, never receiving the fame that Mälzel's machine did and eventually falling into obscurity.

Mälzel continued with exhibitions around the United States until 1828, when he took some time off and visited Europe, returning in 1829. Throughout the 1830s, he continued to tour the United States, exhibiting the machine as far west as the Mississippi River and visiting Canada. In Richmond, Virginia, the Turk was observed by Edgar Allan Poe, who was writing for the Southern Literary Messenger. Poe's essay "Maelzel's Chess Player" was published in April 1836 and is the most famous essay on the Turk, even though many of Poe's hypotheses were incorrect (such as that a chess-playing machine must always win).

Mälzel eventually took the Turk on his second tour to Havana, Cuba. In Cuba, Schlumberger died of yellow fever, leaving Mälzel without an operator for his machine. Dejected, Mälzel died at sea in 1838 at the age of 66 during his return trip, leaving his machinery with the ship captain.

Final years and beyond

When the ship on which Mälzel died returned, his various machines, including the Turk, fell into the hands of Mälzel's friend, the businessman John Ohl. He attempted to auction off the Turk, but owing to low bidding ultimately bought it himself for $400. Only when John Kearsley Mitchell from Philadelphia, Edgar Allan Poe's personal physician and an admirer of the Turk, approached Ohl did the Turk change hands again. Mitchell formed a restoration club and went about the business of repairing the Turk for public appearances, completing the restoration in 1840.

As interest in the Turk outgrew its location, Mitchell and his club chose to donate the machine to the Chinese Museum of Charles Willson Peale. While the Turk still occasionally gave performances, it was eventually relegated to the corners of the museum and forgotten about until 5 July 1854, when a fire that started at the National Theater in Philadelphia reached the Museum and destroyed the Turk. Mitchell believed he had heard "through the struggling flames ... the last words of our departed friend, the sternly whispered, oft repeated syllables, 'echec! echec!!

John Gaughan, an American manufacturer of equipment for magicians based in Los Angeles, spent $120,000 building his own version of Kempelen's machine over a five-year period from 1984. The machine uses the original chessboard, which was stored separately from the original Turk and was not destroyed in the fire. The first public display of Gaughan's Turk was in November 1989 at a history of magic conference. The machine was presented much as Kempelen presented the original, except that the opponent was replaced by a computer running a chess program.

Revealing the secrets
While many books and articles were written during the Turk's life about how it worked, most were inaccurate, drawing incorrect inferences from external observation.

The first articles on the mechanism were published in a French magazine entitled Le Magasin pittoresque in 1834. It was not until Silas Mitchell's series of articles for The Chess Monthly that the secret was fully revealed. Mitchell, son of the final private owner of the Turk, wrote that "no secret was ever kept as the Turk's has been. Guessed at, in part, many times, no one of the several explanations ... ever solved this amusing puzzle". As the Turk was lost to fire at the time of this publication, Silas Mitchell felt that there were "no longer any reasons for concealing from the amateurs of chess, the solution to this ancient enigma".

The most important biographical history about the Chess-player and Mälzel was presented in The Book of the First American Chess Congress, published by Daniel Willard Fiske in 1857. The account, "The Automaton Chess-Player in America", was written by Professor George Allen of Philadelphia, in the form of a letter to William Lewis, one of the former operators of the chess automaton.

In 1859, a letter published in the Philadelphia Sunday Dispatch by William F. Kummer, who worked as an operator under John Mitchell, revealed another piece of the secret: a candle inside the cabinet. A series of tubes led from the lamp to the turban of the Turk for ventilation. The smoke rising from the turban would be disguised by the smoke coming from the other candelabra in the area where the game was played.

Later in 1859, an uncredited article appeared in Littell's Living Age that purported to be the story of the Turk from French magician Jean Eugène Robert-Houdin. This was rife with errors ranging from dates of events to a story of a Polish officer whose legs were amputated, but ended up being rescued by Kempelen and smuggled back to Russia inside the machine.

A new article about the Turk did not turn up until 1899, when The American Chess Magazine published an account of the Turk's match with Napoleon Bonaparte. The story was basically a review of previous accounts, and a substantive published account would not appear until 1947, when Chess Review published articles by Kenneth Harkness and Jack Straley Battell that amounted to a comprehensive history and description of the Turk, complete with new diagrams that synthesized information from previous publications. Another article written in 1960 for American Heritage by Ernest Wittenberg provided new diagrams describing how the operator sat inside the cabinet.

In Henry A. Davidson's 1945 publication A Short History of Chess, significant weight is given to Poe's essay which erroneously suggested that the player sat inside the Turk figure, rather than on a moving seat inside the cabinet. A similar error would occur in Alex G. Bell's 1978 book The Machine Plays Chess, which falsely asserted that "the operator was a trained boy (or very small adult) who followed the directions of the chess player who was hidden elsewhere on stage or in the theater..."

More books were published about the Turk toward the end of the 20th century. Along with Bell's book, Charles Michael Carroll's The Great Chess Automaton (1975) focused more on the studies of the Turk. Bradley Ewart's Chess: Man vs. Machine (1980) discussed the Turk as well as other purported chess-playing automatons.

It was not until the creation of Deep Blue, IBM's attempt at a computer that could challenge the world's best players, that interest increased again, and two more books were published: Gerald M. Levitt's The Turk, Chess Automaton (2000), and Tom Standage's The Turk: The Life and Times of the Famous Eighteenth-Century Chess-Playing Machine, published in 2002. The Turk was used as a personification of Deep Blue in the 2003 documentary Game Over: Kasparov and the Machine.

Legacy and popular culture

Owing to the Turk's popularity and mystery, its construction inspired a number of inventions and imitations, including Ajeeb, or "The Egyptian", an American imitation built by Charles Hopper that President Grover Cleveland played in 1885, and Mephisto, the self-described "most famous" machine, of which little is known. The first imitation was made while Mälzel was in Baltimore. Created by the Brothers Walker, the "American Chess Player" made its debut in May 1827 in New York. El Ajedrecista was built in 1912 by Leonardo Torres y Quevedo as a chess-playing automaton and made its public debut during the Paris World Fair of 1914. Capable of playing rook and king versus king endgames using electromagnets, it was the first true chess-playing automaton, and a precursor of sorts to Deep Blue.

The Turk was visited in London by Rev. Edmund Cartwright in 1784. He was so intrigued by the Turk that he would later question whether "it is more difficult to construct a machine that shall weave than one which shall make all the variety of moves required in that complicated game". Cartwright would patent the prototype for a power loom within the year. Sir Charles Wheatstone, an inventor, saw a later appearance of the Turk while it was owned by Mälzel. He also saw some of Mälzel's speaking machines, and Mälzel later presented a demonstration of the speaking machines to the researcher and his teenage son. Alexander Graham Bell obtained a copy of a book by Wolfgang von Kempelen on speaking machines after being inspired by seeing a similar machine built by Wheatstone; Bell went on to file the first successful patent for the telephone.

A play, The Automaton Chess Player, was presented in New York City in 1845. The advertising, as well as an article that appeared in The Illustrated London News, claimed that the play featured Kempelen's Turk, but it was in fact a copy of the Turk created by J. Walker, who had earlier presented the Walker Chess-player.

Raymond Bernard's silent feature film The Chess Player (1927) weaves elements from the real story of the Turk into an adventure tale set in the aftermath of the first of the Partitions of Poland in 1772. The film's "Baron von Kempelen" helps a dashing young Polish nationalist on the run from the occupying Russians, who also happens to be an expert chess player, by hiding him inside a chess playing automaton called the Turk, closely based on the real Kempelen model. Just as they are about to escape over the border, the Baron is summoned to Saint Petersburg to present the Turk to the empress Catherine II. In an echo of the Napoleon incident, Catherine attempts to cheat the Turk, who wipes all the pieces from the board in response.

The Turk has also inspired works of literary fiction. In 1849, just a few years before the Turk was destroyed, Edgar Allan Poe published a tale "Von Kempelen and His Discovery". Ambrose Bierce's short story "Moxon's Master", published in 1909, is a morbid tale about a chess-playing automaton that resembles the Turk. In 1938, John Dickson Carr published The Crooked Hinge, a locked-room mystery in his line of Dr. Gideon Fell detective novels. Among the puzzles presented included an automaton that operates in a way that is unexplainable to the characters. Gene Wolfe's 1977 science fiction short story "The Marvellous Brass Chessplaying Automaton" also features a device very similar to the Turk. Robert Loehr's 2007 novel The Chess Machine (published in the UK as The Secrets of the Chess Machine) focuses on the man inside the machine. F. Gwynplaine MacIntyre's 2007 story "The Clockwork Horror" reconstructs Edgar Allan Poe's original encounter with Mälzel's chess-player, and also establishes (from contemporary advertisements in a Richmond newspaper) precisely when and where this encounter took place. A fictional account of the Turk's tour of Europe is featured in a Season 3 episode of The Magnus Archives, a horror podcast by Jonathan Sims.

Walter Benjamin alludes to the Mechanical Turk in the first thesis of his Theses on the Philosophy of History, written in 1940.

Notes

Citations

References

External links

 
 

History of chess
Chess automatons
18th century in chess
Hoaxes in science
Hungarian inventions
Historical robots
18th-century robots
18th-century hoaxes